FIS or fis may refer to:

Science and technology 
 Fis, an E. Coli gene
 Fis phenomenon, a phenomenon in linguistics
 F♯ (musical note)
 Flight information service, an air traffic control service
 Frame Information Structure, a Serial ATA technology

Organizations 
 FIS (company), an American financial services company,
 Fairy Investigation Society,
 Federal Intelligence Service, a Swiss intelligence service,
 Festival Internacional de Santander, a Spanish music festival,
 Fiji Intelligence Services,
 Fish Information and Services, an international news agency,
 Flandreau Indian School,
 Frankfurt International School,
 French International School of Hong Kong,
 Fukuoka International School,
 International Ski Federation,
 Islamic Salvation Front, a defunct political party in Algeria,
 Italian Fencing Federation, and
 Italian Scout Federation.

Surname 
 Julio Fis (born 1974), Spanish handball player
 Ljubomir Pavićević Fis (born 1927), Serbian designer

Anthropology 
 Fis is also the Albanian word for the Albanian clans.

See also 
 FI (disambiguation)